The Scottish Women's Premier League (SWPL) is the highest level of league competition in women's football in Scotland. Its two divisions are SWPL 1 and SWPL 2. The league was formed when the Premier Division of the Scottish Women's Football League (SWFL) broke away to form the SWPL in 2002. SWPL 2 was introduced in 2016.

The divisions contain (in the 2022–23 season) 12 clubs in SWPL 1 and eight in SWPL 2. Glasgow City have won 15 League championships, including 14 in succession from 2007 until 2021. The champions and runners-up of SWPL 1 qualify for the UEFA Women's Champions League.

From 2002, the league was owned and managed by Scottish Women's Football. Administration of the SWPL was taken over by the Scottish Football Association in 2007, then by the Scottish Professional Football League in 2022. The SWPL runs on the winter calendar but operated a summer-season format from 2009 until 2020.

History

2002–2009

From the Scottish Women's Football Association national and regional leagues dating from 1972, the SWFA and clubs formed the Scottish Women's Football League (SWFL) in 1999, with four national divisions. Its top division broke away to form the Scottish Women's Premier League (SWPL) in 2002, with the aim of introducing a more professional attitude and increasing media interest. The twelve founder members of the SWPL were Ayr United, Cove Rangers, Dundee, Giulianos, Glasgow City, F.C. Hamilton, Hibernian, Inver-Ross, F.C. Kilmarnock, Lossiemouth, Raith Rovers and Shettleston.

In the 2002–03 season, Kilmarnock became the champions, after a title race with Hibernian. Kilmarnock Ladies had formed from the 1971 Scottish Women's Cup-winners Stewarton Thistle, and Killie also won the 2001–02 SWFL, two Scottish Cups, and four consecutive League Cups. Kilmarnock's success faded after the departure of manager Jim Chapman and of Scotland internationals including Shelley Kerr, Joanne Love and Linda Brown.

Hibernian Ladies were the most successful club in the League's first five years. The title in 2003–04 went to Hibs, 14 points ahead of Glasgow City, and Hibernian added further titles in 2005–06 and in 2006–07 (winning every game that season). The Hibs squad included Scotland's Pauline Hamill, Kirsty McBride, Suzanne Grant, Joelle Murray and Kim Little.

Glasgow City won the Scottish championship for the first time in 2004–05, coached by Peter Caulfield. The club's next title was in season 2007–08, beating Hibernian by five points, with Celtic placing third in its first season. In 2007, the running of the League was taken over by the Scottish Football Association while the SWFA, renamed SWF, thereafter operated as part of the SFA.

2009–2019
The women's leagues' move from a winter to a summer schedule (March–November), from 2009, saw a rise in attendances in its first seasons, and far fewer match postponements.

In the 11-year era of the summer schedule in Scottish women's football, Glasgow City won every title and became one of the most dominant clubs in any national league in world football. Between the 2007–08 and 2015 seasons, City lost only four matches in the League, with squads including Jane Ross, Denise O'Sullivan (each a winner of the SWPL Players' Player of the Year), and Leanne Ross, who ultimately scored 250 goals in 12 seasons at the club. Glasgow City also won the domestic Treble in 2012, 2013, 2014 and 2015.

Glasgow City considered applying to join the English league in 2013. Club co-founder Carol Anne Stewart commented, "the FA are investing seriously in women's football. This is where the SFA are miles behind. They don't recognise the potential".

The issue of competitive imbalance was the catalyst for the separation of the top Scottish clubs into two reduced divisions, SWPL 1 and SWPL 2, in 2016.

The first professional contracts in the SWPL were signed at Glasgow Girls (Glasgow Women) in 2016, by Lauren Coleman and Lauren Evans. The next full-time contracts were offered later by Rangers and Celtic.

2020–present
There were fears for the league's survival when the 2020 season was halted and eventually voided due to the COVID-19 pandemic. Along with other Scottish football organisations, the SWPL and SWF Championship received donations from the philanthropist James Anderson and from an anonymous donor: "The focus was to buy time so the women’s game could survive the COVID crisis until it was safe for football to return." The £437,500 total was the biggest investment in SWF to date.

The 2020–21 season was completed, as Glasgow City won their 14th title in a row. In 2022, a majority of the 17 SWPL clubs voted to leave SWF and join the SPFL after months of negotiations between those parties and the SFA, and an SFA review from April 2020 until mid-2021, which resolved to improve governance of elite competitions. The decision was aimed at improving the league's commercial profile and broadcasting deal. The league maintained its two divisions and expanded to 20 clubs. The top two tiers of women's football are run within the SPFL by a separate board that includes the clubs' representatives.

Format
From  until 2008–09, the SWPL followed Scottish football's traditional autumn-spring calendar, as the SWFL had. Scottish Women's Football changed all leagues to a summer format and the SWPL became a summer league from 2009 until 2020, running from March until November. The 2009 season was shortened to fit, as a single round-robin. The 2020 season was abandoned due to COVID-19, and Scottish women's football has reverted to winter seasons from  onwards.

The initial Women's Premier League format (2002–03 until 2010), was based on a double round-robin of 12 clubs. Some seasons had fewer games, in part due to the withdrawals of Shettleston (2003–04), Newburgh Juniors (2007–08), and Queen's Park (2008–09). The 2011 season had an 11-club league. From 2012 until 2015, the SWPL division used the "split" format for the first and last half of the season: a 12-team single round-robin, then a double round-robin between the top six and bottom six clubs respectively, to decide league champions and two relegation places to the First Division (SWFL 1).

The two-division format that began in 2016 created SWPL 1 and SWPL 2, with eight clubs in each, playing each other three times a season; the mid-season "split" was discontinued. Only the SWPL 2 champion club was promoted, while its two last-placed teams were relegated to SWFL 1.

SWPL 2 was expanded to 10 clubs in 2020. SWPL 1 expanded to 10 clubs in 2021–22, but, because of the withdrawal of SWPL 1's Forfar Farmington from the SWPL, three clubs were promoted from SWPL 2, which shrank to seven clubs playing each other four times.

A 12-club "split" format is returning in SWPL 1 in 2022–23, but with a double round-robin before the "split". SWPL 2 added three clubs from the Championship; SWPL 2 has eight teams playing each other four times, one automatic promotion place to SWPL 1, and a second place decided by a promotion/relegation play-off.

The SWPL champions have qualified for the UEFA Women's Cup/Women's Champions League since 2003; the first Scottish club to qualify had been the SWFL's Ayr United in 2001. Glasgow City were the first Scottish club to reach the last 16 (2008–09) and the quarter-finals (2014–15, 2019–20). Depending on the Scottish national coefficient, the league runners-up have also qualified in some seasons since 2015, including in 2021–22.

2022–23 teams

SWPL 1

SWPL 2

Champions

List of Scottish Women's Premier League seasons:

SWPL 2

Past SWPL clubs include Ayr United, Dundee, Cove Rangers, Giulianos, Inver-Ross, Lossiemouth, Raith Rovers, Shettleston, East Kilbride, Hutchison Vale, Newburgh Juniors, and Forfar Farmington. Clubs taken over by existing members include Arsenal North (Celtic) and Whitehill Welfare/Edinburgh Ladies (Spartans).

Broadcasting
In September 2018, it was announced that BBC Alba would broadcast four SWPL 1 matches during the remainder of the 2018 season. Scottish Women's Football (SWF) and BBC Alba also announced that this will be a two-year deal for six games per year, including the Scottish Women's Cup final and Scottish Women's Premier League Cup final.

Sponsorship
The league's sponsors in 2002–03 were Thompsons Solicitors. From 2018, the league was sponsored by the Scottish Building Society. In November 2021 Park's Motor Group became the sponsor, initially running until the end of the 2021–22 season.

In popular culture
The Scottish Women's Premier League table was first included in the Evening Times Wee Red Book in 2008–09.

References

External links

Current season at women.soccerway.com
SWPL dates, results and final tables since 2002 at the Scottish Football Historical Results Archive

 
1
Scot
2002 establishments in Scotland
Sports leagues established in 2002
Former summer association football leagues